Helen of Greece may refer to:

 Helen of Troy, daughter of Zeus and Leda in Greek mythology
 Helen of Greece and Denmark (1896–1982), Greek and Danish princess